The Tianqi Emperor (23 December 1605 – 30 September 1627), personal name Zhu Youjiao, was the 16th Emperor of the Ming dynasty, reigning from 1620 to 1627. He was the eldest son of the Taichang Emperor and a elder brother of the Chongzhen Emperor, who succeeded him. "Tianqi", the era name of his reign, means "heavenly opening".

Biography
Zhu Youjiao became emperor at the age of 15, following the death of his father, the Taichang Emperor, who ruled less than a month. He did not pay much attention to state affairs, and was accused of failing in his filial duties to his late father by not continuing the latter's wishes. It is possible that Zhu Youjiao suffered from a learning disability or something more. He was illiterate and showed no interest in his studies. However, he was an outstanding carpenter and craftsman, often spending vast amounts of time on woodworking and instructing his servants to sell his creations undercover on the market just to see how much they were worth.

Because the Tianqi Emperor was unable to read court memorials and uninterested in state affairs, the court eunuch Wei Zhongxian and the emperor's wet nurse Madam Ke seized power and controlled the Ming imperial court, with the Tianqi Emperor as merely a puppet ruler. The Tianqi Emperor apparently devoted his time to carpentry. Wei Zhongxian took advantage of the situation and began appointing the people he trusted to important positions in the imperial court. Meanwhile, Madam Ke sought to retain power by removing all other women from the emperor's harem by locking away the emperor's concubines and starving them to death. It is believed that he had two private palaces; one for his female lovers and one for his male lovers.

One Confucian moralist group, the Donglin Movement, expressed distress at the conditions of the government. In response, the imperial court, under Wei Zhongxian's control, covertly ordered the execution of a number of officials associated with the Donglin Movement. Living conditions worsened during the Tianqi Emperor's reign. The Ming dynasty also faced several popular uprisings.

The Tianqi Emperor died heirless on 30 September 1627 due to his only son having died in the Wanggongchang Explosion and was succeeded by his fifth and sole surviving brother, Zhu Youjian, because he had no sons to succeed him. Zhu Youjian was enthroned as the Chongzhen Emperor. As both the Tianqi Emperor's daughters died early too, it seems that there are no natural heirs from the emperor left alive.

Family

Consorts and Issue:
 Empress Xiao'aizhe, of the Zhang clan (1610–1644), personal name Yan
 Zhu Ciran, Crown Prince Huaichong (4 November 1623), first son
 Consort Hui, of the Fan clan, later Imperial Noble Consort
 Princess Yongning (1622–1624), personal name Shu'e, first daughter
 Zhu Ciyu, Crown Prince Daohuai (1623–1624), second son
 Consort Rong, of the Ren clan, later Imperial Noble Consort
 Zhu Cijiong, Crown Prince Xianhuai (31 October 1625 – 30 May 1626), third son, died during the Wanggongchang Explosion
 Consort Gonghuichun, of the Duan clan (10 May 1607 – 3 July 1629)
 Consort Cheng, of the Li clan (1605 – 21 December 1637)
 Princess Huaining (1624), personal name Shumo, second daughter
 Consort Daoshunyu, of the Zhang clan (22 August 1606 – 16 September 1623)
 Consort Liang, of the Wang clan
 Noble Lady, of the Feng clan
 Noble Lady, of the Hu clan (d. 1623)

Ancestry

Portrayals in the media
In August and September 2009, a 42-hour television series dramatising the events during the reign of the Tianqi Emperor was shown on Chinese television – two hours per night for 21 days. It vividly showed how a hereditary monarchy can lead to the rampant abuse of power. The series ended on 17 September, just two weeks before the 60th anniversary (five 12-year cycles) of the establishment of the People's Republic of China.

See also
 Family tree of Chinese monarchs (late)

References

Further reading

1605 births
1627 deaths
17th-century Chinese monarchs
17th-century LGBT people
Illiterate monarchs
LGBT heads of state
Chinese LGBT people
LGBT royalty
Ming dynasty emperors